"Stakeknife" is the code name of a high-level spy who successfully infiltrated the Provisional Irish Republican Army (IRA) while working for the top-secret Force Research Unit (FRU) of the British Army. Reports claim that Stakeknife worked for British intelligence for 25 years. Stakeknife has been accused of being a double agent who oversaw the murders of informers within the IRA while working for the British. British officials launched Operation Kenova to investigate these claims of state involvement in the kidnap, torture and murder of more than 50 individuals, leading to the arrest of Freddie Scappaticci in January 2018 on accusations that he was Stakeknife—a claim which Scappaticci denied.

Activity
"Stakeknife" had his own dedicated handlers and agents, and it was suggested that he was important enough that MI5 set up an office dedicated solely to him. Rumours suggested that he was being paid at least £80,000 a year and had a bank account in Gibraltar.

Serious allegations have emerged to the effect that the British government allowed up to 40 people to be killed via the IRA's Internal Security Unit or "Nutting Squad" to protect his cover.

Purported exposure
In 1987, Sam McCrory, an Ulster Defence Association/"Ulster Freedom Fighters" member, killed the 66-year-old Francisco Notarantonio at his home in Ballymurphy in West Belfast. The UDA/UFF had decided to target a senior Belfast IRA member who unbeknownst to them was an informer for the Force Research Unit (FRU). It has been alleged that FRU agent Brian Nelson gave Notarantonio's name to the UDA/UFF to protect the identity of the real spy.

On 11 May 2003, several newspapers named Freddie Scappaticci as Stakeknife. Scappaticci, born in Belfast to Italian parents, denied the claims and launched an unsuccessful legal action to have the British government state he was not their agent. He later left Northern Ireland and was rumoured to be living in Cassino, Italy. There were also reported sightings in Tenerife.

A report in a February 2007 edition of the Belfast News Letter reported that a cassette recording allegedly of Scappaticci talking about the number of murders he was involved in via the "Nutting Squad", as well as his work as an Army agent, had been lodged with the PSNI in 2004 and subsequently passed to the Stevens Inquiry in 2005.

The former British Intelligence agent who worked in the FRU known as "Martin Ingram" has written a book titled Stakeknife since the original allegations came to light in which it says Scappaticci was the agent in question.

In October 2015, it was announced that Scappaticci was to be investigated by the Police Service of Northern Ireland over at least 24 murders. In June 2016, it was announced that this investigation would be carried out by Bedfordshire Police and would examine the possible involvement of members of the RUC, Army and MI5 in murders carried out by the IRA, and their knowledge of them through the information supplied via Stakeknife. Scappaticci was arrested in connection with Operation Kenova in January 2018.

On 29 October 2020, the Public Prosecution Service for Northern Ireland decided that there was insufficient evidence to put him on trial on charges of perjury. Stephen Herron, the PPS director in the area, also ruled out prosecutions of former members of the security services who are understood to have been his handlers as well as a former member of the PPS. This means that there is little chance of him appearing in a criminal trial, despite a multimillion pound investigation into his role as a state agent inside the IRA.

References

Further reading
 Matthew Teague, (April 2006)  "Double Blind: The untold story of how British intelligence infiltrated and undermined the IRA." The Atlantic
 Greg Harkin and Martin Ingram (2004), Stakeknife: Britain's secret agents in Ireland, O'Brien Press
 British Irish Rights Watch Report
 stakeknife.eu

External links
Operation Kenova

Provisional Irish Republican Army
British spies
Espionage scandals and incidents
Irish spies during The Troubles (Northern Ireland)
Unidentified people